KULL (100.7 FM) is a classic hits radio station located in and serving the area around Abilene, Texas. It is under ownership of Townsquare Media.

History
On April 9, 2012 KFGL changed their format from oldies (as "True Oldies") to classic hits, branded as "Kool FM 100.7" under new call letters, KULL. The station has shifted to playing classic hits of the past 40 years.

References

External links
KULL official website

ULL
Classic hits radio stations in the United States
Radio stations established in 1974
1974 establishments in Texas
Townsquare Media radio stations